John Lawrence "Lorne" Stewart (c. 1909 – September 29, 1968) was a Canadian curler. He was the third of the 1934 Brier Champion team (skipped by his Leo Johnson), representing Manitoba.

References

Brier champions
1900s births
1968 deaths
Curlers from Winnipeg
Canadian male curlers